Villesse is a comune (municipality) in the Province of Gorizia in the Italian region Friuli-Venezia Giulia, located about  northwest of Trieste and about  southwest of Gorizia.

Villesse borders the following municipalities: Campolongo al Torre, Fogliano Redipuglia, Gradisca d'Isonzo, Romans d'Isonzo, Ruda, San Pier d'Isonzo, Tapogliano.

Demographic evolution

References

Cities and towns in Friuli-Venezia Giulia